Cymatiidae is a family of large sea snails in the superfamily Tonnoidea and the order Littorinimorpha. Members of this family are predators.

Genera
The family Cymatiidae contains the following genera:

 Argobuccinum Herrmannsen, 1846
 Austrosassia Finlay, 1931
 Austrotriton Cossmann, 1903
 Cabestana Röding, 1798
 Cymatiella Iredale, 1924
 Cymatium Roding, 1798
 Cymatona Iredale, 1929
 Distorsomina Beu, 1998
 Fusitriton Cossmann, 1903
 Gelagna Schauffus, 1869
 Gutturnium Mørch, 1852
 Gyrineum Link, 1807
 Halgyrineum Beu, 1998
 Linatella Gray, 1857
 Lotoria Emerson & Old, 1963
 Monoplex Perry, 1810
 Personella Conrad, 1865
 Proxicharonia Powell, 1938
 Ranularia Schumacher, 1817
 Reticutriton Habe & Kosuge, 1966
 Sassia Bellardi, 1873
 Septa Perry, 1810
 Turritriton Dall, 1904

References

 Miocene Gastropods and Biostratigraphy of the Kern River Area, California; United States Geological Survey Professional Paper 642